James Andrew Furey (born September 22, 1932) is an American former gridiron football player who played for the Calgary Stampeders, BC Lions and New York Titans. He played college football at Kansas State University.

References

1932 births
Living people
Calgary Stampeders players
BC Lions players
New York Titans (AFL) players
American football linebackers
Canadian football linebackers
American players of Canadian football
Kansas State Wildcats football players
Players of American football from Newark, New Jersey
Players of Canadian football from Newark, New Jersey